Joey Gibson (born August 11, 1945) is an American model who was Playboy magazine's Playmate of the Month for its June 1967 issue. Her centerfold (shot on a beach while building a sandcastle in the nude) was photographed by Peter Gowland.

In the aftermath of Gibson's centerfold appearance it was revealed that she had been convicted on prostitution charges in Santa Monica, California. Esquire magazine presented her with one of its Dubious Achievement Awards. The accompanying caption read "for Joey Gibson 1967 was a year of both promise and travail."

See also
List of people in Playboy 1960–1969

References

External links
 

1945 births
Living people
People from Santa Monica, California
1960s Playboy Playmates